The Squash at the 2014 Commonwealth Games held at the Scotstoun Sports Campus, Glasgow. Singles play took place from 24 July to 28 July.

Nick Matthew defeated James Willstrop 11–9, 8–11, 11–5, 6–11, 11–5 in 99 minutes to win the gold medal.

Medalists

Seeds

Draws & Results

Main draw
The draw.

Finals

Top Half

Section 1

Section 2

Bottom Half

Section 1

Section 2

Plate

Classic

Consolation

Qualification

Plate

References

Squash at the 2014 Commonwealth Games